The Selby Baronetcy, of Whitehouse in the County of Durham, was a title in the Baronetage of England. It was created on 3 March 1664 for George Selby, of Whitehouse, Ryton, County Durham. The title became extinct on the death of the second Baronet, who only held the baronetcy for one hour, in 1668.

Selby of Whitehouse (1664)

Sir George Selby, 1st Baronet (1627–1668)
Sir George Selby, 2nd Baronet (died 1668)

See also
 Selby family
 Selby-Bigge baronets

References
 Burke's Genealogical and Heraldic Dictionary of the Extinct and Dormant Baronetcies of England (1844) p 478
 

Extinct baronetcies in the Baronetage of England
1664 establishments in England
Selby family